"Anak" (Filipino for child or more gender specific my son or my daughter) is a Tagalog song written by Filipino folk-singer Freddie Aguilar. It made the finals for the inaugural 1978 Metropop Song Festival held in Manila. It became an international hit, and was translated into 27 languages. The lyrics speak of Filipino family values. The current copyright owner of the song is Star Music, a recording company owned by the media conglomerate ABS-CBN Corporation. It was produced by Celso Llarina of VST & Co. Tito Sotto was the executive producer for this song as well as its album of the same name.

Inspiration and composition
Freddie Aguilar left home at the age of 18 without graduating from school. His father, who had wanted him to be a lawyer, was disappointed. Freddie traveled to faraway places carrying with him only his guitar. With no one to guide and discipline him, he got into gambling. Realizing and regretting his mistakes five years later, Freddie composed "Anak", a song of remorse and apology to his parents. He went back home and asked for forgiveness from his parents, who welcomed him with open arms. After his father read the lyrics of "Anak", the two became closer. The homecoming proved timely as his father died not long after. According to Felipe de Leon, Jr., an authority on Philippine music, the song was composed in a Western style but has aspects of pasyon, a form that many Filipinos can identify with.

Impact
"Anak" became a finalist in the first MetroPop Song Festival. It went on to become very popular in the Philippines and eventually abroad. The song generated a hundred cover versions, was released in 56 countries and in 27 different foreign languages, and is claimed to have sold 30 million copies. This was unlikely, however, and only threea songs have been confirmed to have sold at least 30 million copies.

An eponymous film was released in 2000, with a plot inspired by the lyrics of the song.

Other recordings or versions

 ASIN (from the 1978 album “Asin”)
 Larry Matias (from the 1978 self-titled album)
 Tito, Vic, and Joey (parody entitled, Anak ng Kuwan, from their album, Iskul Bukol)
 Blonker, (band of German guitar player Dieter Geike, from their 1982 album "Fantasia")
 Regine Velasquez (from the 1991 album Tagala Talaga)
 Gary Valenciano (from the 2000 movie soundtrack Anak) (only appears on the movie soundtrack)
 Sharon Cuneta (from the 2000 movie Anak) (used in movie credits)
 Kuh Ledesma (from the 2000 album Duet With Me)
 Side A (from the 2001 album The Platinum Collection)
 The Kelly Family (from the 1980 single Alle Kinder brauchen Freunde)
 Michael Holm ("Kind" which means Child in German)
 Noel Cabangon (from the 2012 album, Tuloy Ang Biyahe)
 Cusco (entitled "Philippines", from their 1983 album Virgin Islands)
 Mitoy Yonting (from the 2013 various artists album The Voice of the Philippines: The Final 4)
 Ramon Jacinto (from the 1992 instrumental album The Guitarman II) (used in the instrumental medley includes "Walk Don't Run" and "Diamond Head")
 Victor Wood (from the 1979 Indonesian Album)
 愛著啊 by Jody Chiang (江蕙) from album 愛著啊 (Taiwanese language)
 Sarah Geronimo (from the 2012 album Pure OPM Classics)
 Tha Chin Myar Nae Lu by playboy Than Naing (1980) 
 သီခ်င္းမ်ားနဲ႔လူ by Htoo Ein Thin ( ေတးျမံဳငွက္ ႏွစ္ (၅၀) ၂ (၂၀၀၃) ေတးစု )
 Carefree (from the 1979 album Kebebasan) (Malay language)
 Vader Abraham (Dutch language, singing about his childhood home town Elst)
 KZ Tandingan sang parts of the song in both Tagalog and Mandarin languages on the breakout round of the sixth season of Singer 2018
 아들 by Lee Yong-Bok (Korean language, 1979)
 아들 by Jung Yoon-Sun (Korean language, 1981)
 息子 by Jiro Sugita (1978)
 息子 by Tokiko Kato (1978)
 Child (Anak) by Louie Castro (賈思樂) from 1979 album It's O.K. in Hong Kong (English language)
 孩兒 by Alan Tam (譚詠麟) from 1979 album 反斗星 in Hong Kong (Cantonese language)
 你的影子 by Kenny Bee (鍾鎮濤) from 1979 album 我的夥伴 in Hong Kong (Mandarin language)
 三分、七分 by Paula Tsui (徐小鳳) from 1982 album 徐小鳳全新歌集 in Hong Kong (Cantonese language)

In popular culture

Media
"Anak", in both Filipino and Korean versions, was featured in the 2015 South Korean action film Gangnam Blues.

Charts

Weekly charts

Year-end charts

References

External links
 Anak Epilog, youtube.com
 
 

1978 songs
1978 singles
Philippine folk songs
Manila sound songs
Sarah Geronimo songs
RCA Records singles
Tagalog-language songs